Commonwealth Foundation presented a number of prizes between 1987 and 2011. The main award was called the Commonwealth Writers' Prize and was composed of two prizes: the Best Book Prize (overall and regional) was awarded from 1987 to 2011; the Best First Book prize was awarded from 1989 to 2011. In addition the Commonwealth Short Story Competition was awarded from 1996 to 2011.

Beginning in 2012, Commonwealth Foundation discontinued its previous awards and created a new cultural initiative called Commonwealth Writers, which offered two new awards: the Commonwealth Book Prize for the best first book, in which regional winners received £2,500 and the overall winner received £10,000; and the Commonwealth Short Story Prize for the best short stories, in which regional winners received £1,000 and the overall winner received £5,000. After two years, the Book Prize was discontinued. The Short Story Prize remains the sole award from Commonwealth Writers.

Commonwealth Short Story Prize

The Commonwealth Short Story Prize, set up in 2012, is awarded annually for a piece of unpublished short fiction. It is open to Commonwealth citizens aged 18 and over who have had little or no work published and is particularly aimed at those places with little or no publishing industry.

Commonwealth Book Prize (2012–13) 
Awarded for best first book, the Commonwealth Book Prize was established in 2012 for writers who were Commonwealth citizens aged 18 or over and who have had their first novel (full-length work of fiction) published in the year of entry. The Commonwealth Book Prize was part of an initiative by the Commonwealth Foundation called Commonwealth Writers, which seeks to unearth, develop and promote the best new fiction from across the Commonwealth.

Regional winners received £2,500 and the overall winner received £10,000.

The prize was active for two years, 2012 and 2013, and then discontinued.

Commonwealth Short Story Competition (1996–2011)

The Commonwealth Short Story Competition was an annual literary award. It was established in 1996 and administered by the Commonwealth Foundation in partnership with the Commonwealth Broadcasting Association.

Each year winning stories from different regions of the Commonwealth were recorded and broadcast on radio stations across the Commonwealth. The winner received a prize of £2,000 and there were regional prizes of £500 and highly commended prizes of £100.

In 2011 the competition was discontinued.

Commonwealth Writers' Prize
The Commonwealth Writers' Prize was established in 1987, as a successor to the Commonwealth Poetry Prize. Each year, prizes for Best Book (1987–2011) and Best First Book (1989–2011) were awarded in four regions: Africa, Caribbean and Canada, South Asia and Europe and South East Asia and Pacific. Eight regional winners then competed for the pan-Commonwealth Best Book and Best First Book prizes, awarded at a public programme held in a different Commonwealth country each year.

The award was discontinued in 2011, when the Commonwealth Foundation launched a new cultural programme, Commonwealth Writers, which offered the Commonwealth Short Story Prize.

Commonwealth Writers' Prize: Best Book (1987–2011)

In the following lists for the Best Book Prize and Best First Book, the overall winners are in bold and in blue background; those not in bold are the winners of the listed regions.

Commonwealth Writers' Prize: Best First Book (1989–2011)

Notes

External links
Commonwealth Writers
Commonwealth Writers' Prize

"Commonwealth Writers Prize" (winners 2002-12), www.literaryfestivals.co.uk.
Commonwealth Foundation

Commonwealth Writers awards
Short story awards
First book awards
Awards established in 1996
Awards established in 1987
Awards established in 1989
Awards disestablished in 2011